Sebastian Reinert (born 20 April 1987) is a German footballer who plays as a midfielder for SF Bundenthal.

Career
Born in St. Wendel, Reinert played for the local FC Gronig before he transferred to Kaiserslautern's "E-Youth" team in 1996. Since then, he has played 67 matches and scored five goals in both the 1. and 2. Bundesliga. He announced his transfer to SV Wehen on 21 May 2009 and joined his new club on 1 July 2009. On 6 December 2010, he signed with Sportfreunde Lotte of the Regionalliga West, but was released at the end of the season and signed for FK Pirmasens.

International career
Reinert was capped twice for Germany U-20 and once game for the Germany U-21 team.

References

External links
 Profile at Soccerway
 

Living people
1987 births
People from Sankt Wendel (district)
Association football midfielders
German footballers
Germany youth international footballers
Germany under-21 international footballers
1. FC Kaiserslautern players
1. FC Kaiserslautern II players
SV Wehen Wiesbaden players
Sportfreunde Lotte players
Bundesliga players
2. Bundesliga players
3. Liga players
Regionalliga players
Footballers from Saarland
FK Pirmasens players